Višnjik (lit. "Cherry orchard") is a neighborhood in Sarajevo, Bosnia and Herzegovina.

Location
It is located just above central parts of the old city center, and is part of Centar municipality.

History
Neighborhood is conceived as residential, on a hillside above city center never developed before, where, beside many small private gardens, also existed large cherry orchard - hence the name Višnjik (in ). It was designed and developed after the World War II, mostly between early 1950s and late 1960s.

Features
Neighborhood designers utilized the presence of abundant natural greenery on the location, and developed designated space while preserving most of it. This became a main attribute of the neighborhood, one which constitutes important quality and appeal.
Višnjik neighborhood on its northern side borders with large Koševo hospital complex (KCUS, Klinički centar univerziteta Sarajevo).

See also
Sarajevo

References

Neighbourhoods in Grad Sarajevo
Populated places in Centar, Sarajevo